Ruperto Donoso (November 10, 1914 - August 16, 2001) was a jockey in the sport of Thoroughbred horse racing best known for riding Phalanx to victory in the 1947 Belmont Stakes. He also rode Gilded Knight to a second-place finish in the 1939 Preakness Stakes.

A native of Santiago, Chile, Donoso rode in Santiago and at the Hipódromo de Monterrico in Lima, Peru before moving to the United States and riding under contract to Alfred G. Vanderbilt's racing stable.

Ruperto Donoso was required to do mandatory service with the Chilean Army and as such did not race in 1942 and 1943, returning on July 24, 1944 to compete at New York's Belmont Park. In the 1947 U.S. Triple Crown series, superstar jockey Eddie Arcaro rode Phalanx to a second-place finish in the Kentucky Derby and to a third in the Preakness Stakes. It was then that trainer Syl Veitch decided to replace Arcaro with the C. V. Whitney stable's secondary jockey in the Belmont Stakes. Donoso had ridden Phalanx to two wins in 1946 but as the stable's first string jockey, Arcaro had had first choice on all mounts. 

Among his other success, Donoso guided Many Stings to a half-length victory over Big Pebble and fourteen other runners in the Widener Challenge Cup at Hialeah Park. The win brought Leo J. Mark's Le Mar Stock Farm the $52,000 winner's share of the purse.

References

1914 births
2001 deaths
Chilean emigrants to the United States
Chilean jockeys
American jockeys
Sportspeople from Santiago
Chilean Army personnel